Russell Hobby may refer to:
 Russell Hobby (fencer)
 Russell Hobby (trade unionist)